Mafinabad is a village located in Eslamshahr County. In 1956 it had a population of 275.

It was occupied in neolithic times, with pottery being found at an archaeological site.

References

Populated places in Eslamshahr County